Faruk Buljubašić (born 1972 in Bijeljina) is a Bosnian and Croatian songwriter. He moved from his native Bijeljina to Zagreb in 1992 due to the Bosnian War.

He has worked with various top Croatian music festival acts: Hari Mata Hari, Zlatko Pejaković, Nina Badrić, Divas, Branimir Mihaljević, Severina, Željko Bebek, Amir Kazić Leo, Sanja Doležal, Mišo Kovač, Doris Dragović, Toni Cetinski, Novi fosili, Davor Radolfi, Maja Blagdan, Ivana Banfić, Crvena jabuka, Jasmin Stavros, Jasna Zlokić, Marko Perković Thompson, Mate Bulić and others.

References

External links
Faruk Buljubašić discography

Living people
Bosniaks of Bosnia and Herzegovina
Bosniaks of Croatia
Bosnia and Herzegovina songwriters
Croatian songwriters
Bosnia and Herzegovina musicians
Croatian musicians
People from Bijeljina
Musicians from Zagreb
Yugoslav Wars refugees
1972 births